Battle for Sevastopol is a 2015 biographical war film about Lyudmila Pavlichenko, a young Soviet woman who joined the Red Army to fight the German invasion of the USSR and became one of the deadliest snipers in World War II. The film, a joint Russian-Ukrainian production, was released in both countries on 2 April 2015, and its international premiere took place two weeks later at the Beijing International Film Festival.

The movie revolves principally around the events of the siege of Odessa and the siege of Sevastopol of 1941-42.

The film is directed by Sergey Mokritskiy and stars Yulia Peresild as Pavlichenko. In addition to Beijing, where Peresild was awarded Best Actress award, the film has also appeared at Cannes Film Festival.

Plot 
In 1937, Lyudmila Pavlichenko is a student who has just passed the entrance exams for Kyiv State University; to celebrate, she goes to a shooting range with her friends including a female classmate named Masha. In a twist of events, her almost perfect shooting results at the range eventually result in the Red Army contacting her to enter a sharpshooting program. A Jewish doctor named Boris attempts to court her, but she rejects him and leaves to fight on the Eastern Front following the German invasion.

Eventually Lyudmila is partnered with a grizzled veteran sniper named Makarov, with whom she falls in love. He doesn't return her affections, however, and explains that he lost his family when the Germans invaded. She is also reunited with Masha, who is now a nurse engaged with a young pilot. While defending the city of Odessa, she is injured and Makarov drags her to safety to a local hospital, where Boris has volunteered as a military doctor. After awakening, Lyudmila manages to get Boris to sign her papers so that she can return to the front lines, but finds out that Makarov has died in battle and the Soviets are retreating to Sevastopol.

Once back on the front, Lyudmila is paired with a male sniper named Leonid. She begins to wound enemy soldiers to watch them suffer, to her new partner's horror. Despite a rough start to the relationship, the two eventually develop a close romance. Masha, now a nurse on the frontline, invites them to her wedding, but then reveals the death of her fiance. This development leads Lyudmila to tell Leonid privately that she wants a son.

While on patrol in a field, Leonid steps on a mine that triggers a flare, signalling artillery fire on to the pair's position. Lyudmila again wakes up in a field hospital, where Boris tells her Leonid died in the ambush. Though wounded and exhausted, she is ordered to kill a top enemy sniper for Soviet propaganda. The duel lasts for an entire day; tired of waiting, Lyudmila steps out of cover, exposing herself completely. She is shot, but manages to pinpoint the enemy sniper's location and kill him. As Sevastopol is being evacuated under siege, Boris carries a wounded and traumatized Lyudmila to a submarine that is evacuating the city. While panicked civilians attempt to board, Lyudmila realizes that Boris gave her his own papers to leave the city. A voiceover reveals that Boris, Masha, and countless civilians and soldiers died defending the city from the Germans.

Lyudmila's military record makes her a vital propaganda tool for the Soviets, who parade her around the world to collect funds for the fight against fascism. Encouraged by a meeting with the American First Lady, Eleanor Roosevelt, Lyudmila attempts to embrace her femininity by wearing a dress during a speech in New York. Though the Soviet propaganda minister on tour with her forces her to change back in to a Red Army uniform, she makes a vital impression on the largely male crowd, asking, "Don't you think, gentlemen, that you have been hiding behind my back for too long?" After the success of Lyudmila's speech, she is approached by American folk singer Woody Guthrie, who eventually writes a song based on her exploits.

Roosevelt later visits Lyudmila after the war in Moscow during a 1957 trip. The two attend the opera together with Lyudmila's son who is implied to be Leonid's as well.

Cast 
Yuliya Peresild – Lyudmila Pavlichenko
Yevgeny Tsyganov – Leonid Kitsenko
Oleg Vasilkov – Captain Makarov
Nikita Tarasov – Boris Chopak
Joan Blackham – Eleanor Roosevelt
Polina Pakhomova – Masha
Vladimir Lilitsky – Grisha, 1st pilot
Anatoliy Kot – Nikolai, 2nd pilot
Natella Abeleva-Taganova – Sonya Chopaka
Valery Grishko – Ivan Yefimovich Petrov
Sergei Barkovsky – Filipp Oktyabrsky
Vitaliy Linetskyy – Major, recruit trainer
Sergei Puskepalis – 1st commander
Gennady Chentsov – commissar
Svetlana Osadchenko – the reader
Vyacheslav Nikolenko - Woody Guthrie

Production 
The filming began in 2012 after the first archive material devoted to Pavlichenko was examined. Serhiy Mokrytskyi, who is better known as a cinematographer, served as director; after his arrival, the plot was altered to more closely match Pavlichenko's life. During production, there was concern of the growing political tension between Russia and Ukraine. However, the film was successfully released in both countries on the same day, in each country's own respective language.

Box office
The movie grossed RUB 435,468,256 ($8,702,274) in the Russian box office against a budget of RUB 124,000,000 and hence was a commercial success.

References

External links

Official trailer via the official YouTube channel of 20th Century Fox Russia

2015 films
2015 biographical drama films
2015 war drama films
Eastern Front of World War II films
Biographical films about military personnel
Russian biographical drama films
Russian war drama films
Soviet biographical drama films
Films about snipers
Films set in Crimea
Films set in Odesa
Films set in the Soviet Union
Films set in Washington, D.C.
Films set in 1941
Films set in 1942
Films shot in Crimea
Films shot in Odesa
Films shot in Kyiv
Cultural depictions of Eleanor Roosevelt
Ukrainian war films
2015 drama films
Russian World War II films
Ukrainian World War II films
World War II films based on actual events